Nanna Preethiya Hudugi is a 2001 Indian Kannada-language romance film directed and written by Nagathihalli Chandrashekar. It stars newcomers Dhyan and Deepali in lead roles and actors such as Lokesh, Bhavya and Suresh Heblikar in other prominent roles. The film is produced by Jyothi Shankar and Uma Shankar for East West Creations India (Pvt) Ltd. 
 
The story is based on Chandrashekar's own decade-old short story "Malenada Hudugi, Bayaluseeme Huduga". The film was reviewed as average by the critics, and it was declared a musical hit at the box-office. It went on to win two awards at the Filmfare Awards for 2001.

Cast
 Dhyan as Puttu
 Deepali as Chinnu
 Lokesh as Maduve Manjaih 
 Bhavya as Seetha
 Suresh Heblikar
 Vijayalakshmi Singh
 Richard Louis - As postman
 Chitra Shenoy
 Nagathihalli Chandrashekar in a brief role as a teacher

Voice-overs
 Rajesh Krishnan for Dhyan
 Nanditha for Deepali

Production
After the stupendous success of Nagathihalli Chandrashekar's previous venture, America America (1995) which was shot entirely in the United States, he came up with another campus romantic story set at Michigan State University.

For this, he went on a rigorous schedule for casting the leading actors. He conducted a walk-in interview in Bangalore for which over 1,000 candidates appeared and 10 were shortlisted. None of them cleared the screen test. He then conducted the same in Mumbai where he shortlisted Sameer Dattani, a model who had previously appeared in a few advertisements and music videos. He later shortlisted the female lead Deepali, a Bangalore-based girl who was settled in California, online and a subsequent screen test. Playback singers Rajesh Krishnan and Nanditha were roped in to do the voice-overs for the lead actors.

Mano Murthy was chosen by Chandrashekar to score for the film. They met in the US in December 1999 when the latter first narrated the story to the latter. Chandrashekhar upon returning to India made another trip to the US, and shot some videos of cars in Detroit before showing it to Murthy, and asked him to compose a tune to it. After the latter "made a very simple tune", Chandrashekhar wrote "Car Car", the lyrics to it, following which Murthy set them to the tune. Most of the filming was held on the Michigan State University campus; the water sport sequence was shot from white water rafting in West Virginia.

International release
The film completed a 100-day run in Karnataka across many cinema halls. Later, this was internationally released by T.M.S. International with English subtitles.

Soundtrack
The music was composed by Mano Murthy to the lyrics of Nagathihalli Chandrashekar. The song "Car Car Ellnodi Car" became a massive hit song and ruled the audio charts for many months.

Awards
 49th Filmfare Awards South
 Filmfare Award for Best Director - Kannada - Nagathihalli Chandrashekar

References

External source

 Songs
 Nagathihalli Chandrashekhar

2001 films
2001 romantic drama films
Films set in insular areas of the United States
Films set in Detroit
Films scored by Mano Murthy
Indian romantic drama films
Films shot in Detroit
Films based on short fiction
2000s Kannada-language films
Films directed by Nagathihalli Chandrashekhar